André Allen Anjos, better known by his stage name RAC, is a Portland-based Portuguese-American musician and record producer. RAC has created more than 200 remixes in the rock, electronica, and dance music genres for various musical artists, with his work featured in ads from Citigroup and Hulu, among others.  The live, five-piece touring act has been featured at the Coachella Valley Music and Arts Festival, Firefly Music Festival, Bumbershoot, Corona Capital music festival and Lollapalooza music festival.

Early life
André Anjos was born in 1985 in Coimbra, Portugal, to an American mother and a Portuguese father. Anjos's family moved frequently and he has stated that he attended “ten different schools” until his parents settled in Santa Maria da Feira, near Porto. Anjos took up playing the piano when he was 6 and got his first guitar when he was 13. He lived in the US for a time with his parents in the mid-1990s and went back in 2005 to study Music, Media, and Entertainment Business at Greenville College in Illinois. At college he met his wife Liz, who was a piano major. They moved to Portland after graduating and have been based there since. As a musician, Liz Anjos performs under the name Pink Feathers. Anjos' parents and brother also live in the US. In 2021,it is believed that Liz and André divorced.

Music career

Founding Remix Artist Collective
The Remix Artist Collective was created in January 2007 by André Allen Anjos, after recruiting fellow online remixers Aaron Jasinski and
Chris Angelovski. Originally from Porto, Portugal, Anjos founded RAC in Greenville, Illinois, U.S. while he was a student at Greenville College, and became coordinator of the Remix Artist Collective. Later, Andrew Maury (New York City) and Karl Kling (Portland) joined RAC. RAC's first release was "Sleeping Lessons (RAC Mix)" for The Shins, earning the remix a spot as a B-Side on the single release for "Australia." The mix, along with several other projects garnered interest among bands like Tokyo Police Club, Bloc Party, and Ra Ra Riot.

RAC's 2008 Sega Vs. Nintendo EP spurred interest by bloggers and earned a headline from the gaming site Kotaku. In addition to the mention and posting of remixes by online publications such as Pitchfork Media and Brooklyn Vegan, RAC has received more formal recognition in a full-length feature cover article for the St. Louis Riverfront Times, an online interview with Stereo Subversion, and an exclusive free mp3 debut through Stereogum.

Recent years with solo project
RAC has remixed artists such as Kings of Leon, Lana Del Rey, Yeah Yeah Yeahs, Edward Sharpe, Death Cab For Cutie, Phoenix, Foster The People, Linkin Park, Two Door Cinema Club, Bob Marley, U2, Ella Fitzgerald, New Order, Lady Gaga, Odesza, and Washed Out. RAC released their first original song "Hollywood" featuring Penguin Prison's Chris Glover via Green Label Sound on May 3, 2012. "Hollywood" was the promotional single to the debut RAC original album.

RAC released their second original song "Let Go" featuring Bloc Party's Kele and MNDR on August 20, 2013. "Let Go" was the second single from their EP "Don't Talk To", released October 1, 2013. RAC's debut studio album as Anjos' solo project, Strangers, was released on April 1, 2014. Anjos now resides in the USA. The title refers to the fact that the album was primarily made on line, with Anjos never meeting most of the collaborators in real life. Outside of remixing, Anjos has done work creating original music content for HBO's Entourage, and was a principal member of the indie-electronica band, The Pragmatic until its end in 2010. RAC also composed and performed the soundtrack for the videogame Master Spy.

RAC performed at music festivals including the Coachella Valley Music and Arts Festival, Firefly Music Festival, Bumbershoot, the Corona Capital music festival, Ultra Music Festival and the Lollapalooza.

RAC was nominated for a Grammy Award for Say My Name (Odesza featuring Zyra) in 2016.

Its remix of Bob Moses' "Tearing Me Up" won Best Remixed Recording, Non-Classical at the 59th Annual Grammy Awards in 2017.

RAC played a major role in the production of Linkin Park's seventh studio album One More Light.

RAC frequently collaborates with Pink Feathers, the music project of Anjos' wife, Liz Anjos. They met at college in Illinois and moved to Portland, Oregon after graduation. Besides being a musician, Liz Anjos is also a sub-3-hour marathoner. 

As of 2021, André and Liz have split. André is currently dating American model, Ireland Baldwin, in which on December 31, 2022, announced on their social account that they expecting to their first child.

Style and influences
The vision of the Remix Artist Collective was to maintain a style of remixing that strays from the "club mix" archetype, creating new incarnations of songs that stem from the original structure, but expand on their genre and musical arrangement. Early RAC mixes typically feature a blend of hip-hop and vintage drum machine samples, analog synthesizers, melodic hooks, and original instrumentation performed by the remix artists themselves.

Annie Zaleski of the Riverfront Times wrote of Anjos' style: "Unlike many electronic remixes, which are commonly technical and precise, RAC mixes embody a unique aesthetic built on emotion and nuance, an almost intangible warmth and innate playfulness." Anjos' signature remixing sound is in large part a result of some of his equipment, notably, a 1982 Roland Juno-60 and 1973 Univox MiniKorg, though he has also been known to manipulate analog tape machines to achieve effects, and primarily works with Ableton Live to do so.

Members of Remix Artist Collective

Current members
André Allen Anjos

Former members
Andrew Maury 
Aaron Miller
Karl Kling  
Aaron Jasinski
Chris Angelovski

Discography

Albums

Extended plays

Singles

Grammy Awards

!
|-
!scope="row"|2016
|"Say My Name" (RAC Remix)
|Best Remixed Recording
|
|
|-
!scope="row"|2017
|"Tearing Me Up" (RAC Remix)
|Best Remixed Recording
|
|
|-
!scope="row"|2021
|"Do You Ever" (RAC Mix)
|Best Remixed Recording
|
|

References

External links

RAC.fm 
Official SoundCloud page

Counter Records artists
American people of Portuguese descent
Remixers
Musicians from Porto